The 1934 Stanley Cup Finals was contested by the Chicago Black Hawks and the Detroit Red Wings. It was the Red Wings' first appearance in the Finals, and Chicago's second, after 1931. The Black Hawks won the best-of-five series 3–1 to win their first Stanley Cup.

Paths to the Finals
Detroit defeated the Toronto Maple Leafs 3–2 in a best-of-five series to reach the Finals. Chicago defeated the Montreal Canadiens 4—3 and Montreal Maroons 6—2 in two game total-goals series to reach the Finals.

Game summaries
Chicago's Chuck Gardiner would limit Detroit to just two goals in Chicago's three victories, including a shutout in the final game which went to double overtime. It was Mr. Gardiner's last game as he would die of a brain hemorrhage after the season.

Stanley Cup engraving
The 1934 Stanley Cup was presented to Black Hawks captain Charlie Gardiner by NHL President Frank Calder following the Black Hawks 1–0 double overtime win over the Red Wings in game four.

The following Black Hawks players and staff had their names engraved on the Stanley Cup

1933–34 Chicago Black Hawks

See also
1933–34 NHL season

References & notes

 Podnieks, Andrew; Hockey Hall of Fame (2004). Lord Stanley's Cup. Bolton, Ont.: Fenn Pub. pp 12, 50. 

Stanley Cup
Stanley Cup Finals
Chicago Blackhawks games
Detroit Red Wings games
April 1934 sports events
Ice hockey competitions in Detroit
Ice hockey competitions in Chicago
1930s in Chicago
1934 in Detroit
Stanley Cup
1934 in sports in Illinois